The Great Flinders Football League (GFFL) is an Australian rules football competition based in the Eyre Peninsula region of South Australia, Australia. It is an affiliated member of the South Australian National Football League. The current Premiers are the United Yeelanna Football Club who defeated the Elliston Districts Football Club in the 2022 Grand Final at Lock.

Elliston and Western Districts merged and transferred from the Mid West Football League prior to the start of the 2021 season. Near the end of the 2021 season the clubs of the Great Flinders Football League and Great Flinders Netball Association unanimously voted to include Elliston and Districts for the 2022 season and beyond.

Brief history
The Great Flinders Football League began in 1911 as the Flinders Football Association with founding clubs including Cummins, Edillilie, Pilanna, Shannon, Stokes and Yallunda Flat.

Premiers 

1911 Cummins
1912 Cummins
1913 Shannon
1914 Cummins
1915 Shannon
1916-1918 Recess due to WW1
1919 Shannon
1920 Shannon
1921 Shannon
1922 Stars
1923 Shannon
1924 Shannon
1925 Shannon
1926 Ramblers
1927 Shannon
1928 Shannon
1929 Rovers
1930 Ramblers
1931 Yeelanna
1932 Ramblers
1933 Rovers
1934 Rovers
1935 Ramblers
1936 Ramblers
1937 Rovers
1938 Rovers
1939 Rovers
1940 Season suspended
1941-1945 Recess due to WW2
1946 Cockaleechie
1947 Cummins

1948 Ramblers
1949 Ramblers
1950 Ramblers
1951 Cummins
1952 Ramblers
1953 Edillilie 
1954 Edillilie 
1955 Edillilie 
1956 Shannon
1957 Ramblers
1958 Ramblers
1959 Ramblers
1960 Kapinnie
1961 Ramblers
1962 Cummins
1963 Cummins
1964 Ramblers
1965 Kapinnie
1966 Kapinnie
1967 United Yeelanna
1968 Ramblers
1969 Ramblers
1970 Ramblers
1971 Ramblers
1972 Ramblers
1973 Ramblers
1974 Ramblers
1975 Ramblers
1976 Ramblers
1977 Ramblers
1978 Ramblers

1979 Ramblers
1980 Ramblers
1981 Ramblers
1982 Ramblers
1983 United Yeelanna
1984 Kapinnie
1985 Kapinnie
1986 United Yeelanna
1987 United Yeelanna
1988 Kapinnie
1989 Ramblers
1990 Kapinnie
1991 Kapinnie
1992 Kapinnie
1993 Kapinnie
1994 Ramblers
1995 Tumby Bay
1996 Lock
1997 Lock
1998 Ramblers
1999 Tumby Bay
2000 Cummins Kapinnie
2001 Cummins Kapinnie
2002 Ramblers
2003 Ramblers
2004 Ramblers
2005 Ramblers
2006 Ramblers
2007 Tumby Bay
2008 Ramblers
2009 Tumby Bay

2010 Ramblers
2011 Ramblers
2012 United Yeelanna
2013 Ramblers
2014 United Yeelanna
2015 United Yeelanna
2016 United Yeelanna
2017 Ramblers
2018 United Yeelanna
2019 United Yeelanna
2020 Recess due to COVID-19
2021 United Yeelanna
2022 United Yeelanna

Current clubs

Defunct clubs

2012 Ladder

2013 Ladder

2014 Ladder

2015 Ladder

2016 Ladder

2017 Ladder

2018 Ladder

2019 Ladder

2021 Ladder

2022 Ladder

References

Books
 Encyclopedia of South Australian country football clubs / compiled by Peter Lines. 
 South Australian country football digest / by Peter Lines 

Eyre Peninsula
Australian rules football competitions in South Australia